is a Japanese voice actor who was previously affiliated with Across Entertainment. He has been voice acting since 2009. He has often performed voices for minor and guest roles, as well as supporting character roles.

Filmography

Anime television
2011
Hunter × Hunter (2011 series) - Boatsman B (episode 1)
2012
Sword Art Online - player (episodes 1 and 4)
2013
Log Horizon - Michitaka
2014
Space Dandy - Register (episode 13)
D-Frag! - Yokoshima
Hozuki's Coolheadedness - Kakisuke
2015
One-Punch Man - Zeniru, Ancient King, Geryuganshoop
Yu-Gi-Oh! Arc-V - Duel Chaser 227
2017
ACCA: 13-Territory Inspection Dept. - Pochard
Tsugumomo - Kazuaki Kagami 
2018
Darling in the Franxx - Code:214 / Futoshi
2019
Vinland Saga - Torgrim
2020
In/Spectre - Bake-danuki
Tsugu Tsugumomo - Kazuaki Kagami 
Log Horizon: Destruction of the Round Table - Michitaka
2021
Sonny Boy - Rajdhani
2022
Made in Abyss: The Golden City of the Scorching Sun - Majikaja
Spy x Family - Brennan

Unknown date
The Everyday Tales of a Cat God - Makitarō Komiya (episodes 4, 6)
Fairy Tail - Bozu, Gatou, Martam, Bob, Nadal, Wang Chanji
Honto ni Atta! Reibai-Sensei - Cat Sensei; Principal
Humanity Has Declined - as shed owner
Jormungand Perfect Order - Kowit Nualkhair (episode 16)
Majikoi - Oh! Samurai Girls - undersecretary (episodes 8, 10)
Night Raid 1931 - additional voice (episode 2)
Okamikakushi - Masque of the Wolf - Sabu (episode 12)
Sket Dance - male student B (episode 14)

Video games
 Ace Combat: Joint Assault (2010) - additional voices
 E.X. Troopers (2012) - Max
 Gachitora: The Roughneck Teacher in High School (2011) - additional voices
 Overwatch, Junkrat
 Tokyo Afterschool Summoners (2016) - Shiro Motoori
 Trek to Yomi (2022) - Sadatame
 Mario + Rabbids Sparks of Hope (2022) - Beep-0

Dubbing roles

Live-action
Charlie Countryman – Karl (Rupert Grint)
Cuban Fury – Gary (Rory Kinnear)
Divergent – Peter Hayes (Miles Teller)
The Divergent Series: Insurgent – Peter Hayes (Miles Teller)
The Divergent Series: Allegiant – Peter Hayes (Miles Teller)
Doctor Sleep – Charlie (George Mengert)
Dracula Untold – Shkelgim (Zach McGowan)
Final Cut – Armel (Sébastien Chassagne)
House of Cards – Peter Russo (Corey Stoll)
Hummingbird – Billy (Dai Bradley)
Lovelace – Gerry Damiano (Hank Azaria)
Smash – Dev Sundaram (Raza Jaffrey)
Son of a Gun – Wilson (Damon Herriman)
Sushi Girl – Francis (James Duval)
Transcendence – Heng (Fernando Chien)

Animation
The Amazing World of Gumball – Tobias, Leslie, Bobato, Rocky Robinson, Laurence "Larry" Needlemeyer, Anton, Bobert
Hotel Transylvania – Zombie Mask
Skylanders Academy – Kaos

References

External links
 

1985 births
Living people
Japanese male voice actors
Male voice actors from Saitama Prefecture
Across Entertainment voice actors